Carole Ruggier is a British born actress of Egyptian, Maltese, Italian, and Irish descent. As a casting director, director, and voice actress, she is known for her work on award winning video games. Notable voice roles include Athena in God of War (2005) and God of War II (2007) with a cameo in 2018's God of War, as well as Athena in Age of Mythology and Auntie Dot in Halo: Reach. TV roles include playing Amanda Carter, mother of Peggy Carter and Michael Carter, in Agent Carter  episode "Smoke & Mirrors", and multiple voice and sketch appearances on Jimmy Kimmel Live on ABC.

Biography
Ruggier trained as an actress at The Arts Educational School in London and worked extensively in theatre in leading and character roles. Productions include Julius Caesar, Twelfth Night, The Cherry Orchard, The Accrington Pals by Peter Whelan, The Card adapted by Joyce Holliday, Outskirts by Hanif Kureshi, Stags and Hens by Willy Russell, Trafford Tanzi, Good Golly, Miss Molly, I Don't Want to Set the World on Fire, Lady Audley's Secret, The Country Wife, The Wizard of Oz, Chicago, Gypsy, and The Threepenny Opera. In the United States, play roles include The Secret Rapture by David Hare, Disneyland It Ain't by Sue Townsend, Chamber Music by Arthur Kopit, Mary Barnes by Mary Barnes and David Edgar, and Alfie by Bill Naughton. She has produced plays in London, Florida, and Los Angeles, including Take 5, Beached, Disneyland It Ain't, Cochon Flambe, Solos in Harmony, and Nagasaki Dust.

Her first TV role was as a policewoman in Tucker's Luck BBC TV, followed by Life Without George and two BBC TV mini-series Love and Reason, starring Phyllis Logan, and Campion: Death of a Ghost, starring Peter Davison.  TV appearances in the US include Jimmy Kimmel Live, Oh Baby, No Greater Love, It's a Miracle, and Arrest & Trial. She appeared as Peggy Carter's mother in Agent Carter for ABC, set in the Marvel Cinematic Universe. Films include Living Out Loud directed by Richard LaGravenese, Reeker, Love on the Line, Blackmail, Abruptio, Wonderland it Ain't, Dallas Biters Club, and American Snapper. She co-produced the short film, Wonderland It Ain't, co-wrote Dallas Biters Club and in 2015, wrote, produced, and directed the parody, American Snapper.

Her first role as a voice actress was in the 1995 video game MechWarrior 2 as the Narrator (aka Bitchin' Betty) and she was invited to reprise the role for MechWarrior Online in 2013. In 2002, she voiced Professor Jocelyn Peabody in the 26-episode animated TV series Dan Dare: Pilot of the Future.

Casting director credits include games such as Red Dead Revolver, Quake II, Devil May Cry 2, Quantum Redshift, Summoner 2, Red Faction 2, Age of Mythology, Maximo: Ghost to Glory, Steel Battalion, Conquest: Frontier Wars, Crimson Skies, StarLancer, Heavy Gear, and several  Tom Clancy games, including Ghost Recon, The Sum of All Fears, Rogue Spear, and Rainbow Six.

In 2002, Ruggier voiced the character of the Greek goddess Athena in the game Age of Mythology. She would voice the character again, but a different version for a different game for which she is best known. This was for the God of War series, which was originally based on Greek mythology. Her first role as Athena in the series was in the first game, God of War (2005); she also provided the voice of the goddess Aphrodite, who was a minor character in the game. Ruggier reprised Athena in the 2007 sequel God of War II. Erin Torpey took over the role of Athena in subsequent games; however, Ruggier did return to the role for the character's brief cameo appearance in 2018's God of War. She also voiced the Geologist in Jak and Daxter: The Precursor Legacy. Before voicing Auntie Dot in Halo: Reach, Ruggier had only heard of the Halo series, but did not know what it was about until her husband "filled [her] in". She also cast and directed the voices for the games Freelancer, Dino Crisis 3, Devil May Cry 2, Chaos Legion, Combat Flight Simulator 2, and the GameCube remake of Resident Evil.

References

External links

21st-century British actresses
British video game actresses
British voice actresses
20th-century British actresses
British television actresses
British stage actresses
British film actresses
British casting directors
Women casting directors
British voice directors
Place of birth missing (living people)
Year of birth missing (living people)
Living people